Kobuchi Station is the name of two train stations in Japan:

 Kobuchi Station (Akita) (小渕駅)
 Kobuchi Station (Kanagawa) (古淵駅)